Winter solstice is an astronomical phenomenon which marks the shortest day and the longest night of the year.

The winter solstice may be referred to as:
 December solstice in the Northern Hemisphere
 June solstice in the Southern Hemisphere

Winter solstice may also refer to:
 Winter Solstice (film), 2004 American film with Anthony LaPaglia
 Winter Solstice: North (album), a 1999 album by British experimental music group Coil
 Winter Solstice, a 2000 novel by Rosamunde Pilcher
 Winter Solstice, a two-part German-produced TV film from 2003 based on the novel with Sinéad Cusack and Peter Ustinov

See also
 Midwinter (disambiguation)
 Winter (disambiguation)
 Solstice (disambiguation)
 Summer solstice (disambiguation)
 Spring equinox (disambiguation)
 Autumnal equinox (disambiguation)